Driggs-Schroeder was the name of several naval guns designed by US Navy officers William H. Driggs and Seaton Schroeder for the United States Navy in the late 1880s, fitted on ships built in the 1890s. Some Driggs-Schroeder weapons were also adopted by the US Army. Driggs later founded the Driggs-Seabury Ordnance Company in 1897, in partnership with his brother Louis Labadie "L. L." Driggs and Samuel Seabury, a retired US Navy officer.

Driggs-Schroeder weapons included 1-pounder, 3-pounder (Navy Marks 2 and 3), and 6-pounder (Navy Marks 6 and 8) naval guns. All were rapid-firing, which today would be called "single shot", with brass cased ammunition. They were among numerous models of these guns equipped on US Navy ships of the 1890s. Unlike some other manufacturers, Driggs-Schroeder did not design fully automatic 1-pounder and 3-pounder guns. Most Driggs-Schroeder weapons were manufactured by the American Ordnance Company in Bridgeport, Connecticut, with some manufactured by Driggs Ordnance Company.

Olympia is preserved with her Driggs-Schroeder 6-pounders intact at the Independence Seaport Museum in Philadelphia, Pennsylvania.

Driggs-Schroeder designed a "limited recoil" carriage for the US Army's 3.2-inch gun M1890, along with a 3.2-inch field gun based on that weapon with a different breech. These were perhaps the same gun and/or carriage later prototyped by Driggs-Seabury; neither was adopted by the US Army.

A 12-pounder gun on a limited recoil carriage for naval landing forces was submitted to the US Army Ordnance Department in fiscal year 1895; it was not adopted.

An Army 4-inch/40 caliber Driggs-Schroeder rapid-fire gun also existed, probably the same as one of several Navy guns of this type. Only four were emplaced by the Army in coast defense mountings; two at Fort Washington, Maryland 1899–1921 and two at Fort Warren, Massachusetts 1899–1925. Driggs-Schroeder designed 6-pounders designated Marks II and III for the Army; they possibly corresponded to the Navy Marks 6 and 8. Some of these weapons were deployed at coastal artillery forts for land defense. These included experimental quantities on "parapet mounts", wheeled carriages with fittings that allowed them to be secured to pintle mounts set in concrete. A dozen were deployed at Fort Ruger in Hawaii as part of the Land Defense Project of 1915, along with some in the Harbor Defenses of Manila and Subic Bays, Philippines.

References

 
 
 
 Munsey's Magazine Volume XXVI, October 1901 to March 1902, p. 880. Article paragraph covered the Driggs-Schroeder 6-pounders carried on USS Olympia, USS Brooklyn, and USS New York.

Naval artillery
Naval guns of the United States
Artillery of the United States
Coastal artillery